The 2016 Amgen Tour of California was the eleventh edition of the Tour of California cycling stage race. It was held from May 15–22, and rated as a 2.HC event on the UCI America Tour. It began in San Diego and finished in Sacramento.

Schedule

Teams
18 teams were selected to take part in the race. 10 UCI WorldTeams were invited, along with 3 Professional Continental teams and 5 Continental teams.

Stages

Stage 1
15 May 2016 — San Diego to San Diego,

Stage 2
16 May 2016 — South Pasadena to Santa Clarita,

Stage 3
17 May 2016 — Thousand Oaks to Santa Barbara County (Gibraltar Road),

Stage 4
18 May 2016 — Morro Bay to Monterey County (Laguna Seca),

Stage 5
19 May 2016 — Lodi to South Lake Tahoe,

Stage 6
20 May 2016 — Folsom,  Individual time trial

Stage 7
21 May 2016 — Santa Rosa to Santa Rosa,

Stage 8
22 May 2016 — Sacramento to Sacramento,

Classification leadership

In the 2016 Tour of California, 5 jerseys were awarded. For the general classification, calculated by adding the finishing times of the stages per cyclist, the leader received a yellow jersey (Amgen Race Leader Jersey). Time bonuses were awarded for the first three finishers on mass-start stages (10, 6 and 4 seconds respectively) and on intermediate sprints (3, 2 and 1 seconds respectively). This classification was considered the most important of the Tour of California, and the winner of the general classification was considered the winner of the Tour of California.

Additionally, there was also a sprints classification, akin to what is called the points classification in other races, which awards a green jersey (Visit California Sprint Jersey). In the sprints classification, cyclists received points for finishing in the top 15 in a stage. In addition, some points could be won in intermediate sprints as well as bonus seconds in the overall classification. The first across the line got 3 seconds, the second two and the third rider, one.

There was also a mountains classification, which awarded a Polka dots jersey (Lexus King of the Mountain Jersey). In the mountains classifications, points were won by reaching the top of a mountain before other cyclists. Each climb was categorized, either first, second, third, or fourth category, with more points available for the harder climbs.

There was also a youth classification. This classification was calculated the same way as the general classification, but only young cyclists (under 23) were included. The leader of the young rider classification received a white and green jersey (SRAM Best Young Rider Jersey).

The last jersey was awarded to the most combative rider of a stage for him to wear on the next stage. It was generally awarded to a rider who attacks constantly or spent a lot of time in the breakaways. This jersey was blue, white and yellow (Amgen Breakaway from Cancer© Most Courageous Rider Jersey).

There was also a classification for teams. In this classification, the times of the best three cyclists per stage were added, and the team with the lowest time was the leader.

Notes
 In stage 2, Wouter Wippert, who was second in the sprint classification, wore the green jersey, because Peter Sagan (in first place) wore the yellow jersey as leader of the general classification during that stage.

References

External links
 Official website 

Tour of California
Tour of California
Tour of California
Tour of California